Ensenada is a Spanish word meaning bay. 

Ensenada may also refer to:

Boats
Ensenada 20, an American sailboat design

People
 N. Senada, a possible composer who is said to have collaborated with the rock band The Residents
 Marquis of Ensenada (1702–1781), a Spanish statesman

Places
 Ensenada, Baja California, a city in Mexico
 Ensenada Municipality, a subdivision of the Mexican state of Baja California 
 Ensenada, Buenos Aires, a city in Argentina
 Ensenada Partido, a subdivision of Buenos Aires Province, Argentina
 Ensenada, a small locality next to Puerto Varas, Chile
 Ensenada, New Mexico
 Ensenada, Guánica, Puerto Rico, a barrio 
 Ensenada, Rincón, Puerto Rico, a barrio
 La Ensenada, Panama